The name HMNZS Moa may apply to:

 , a minesweeper commissioned in 1941
 , a patrol boat commissioned in 1983

Royal New Zealand Navy ship names